Seirijai is a small town in Alytus County in southern Lithuania. In 2011 it had a population of 788.

Etymology

Seirijai toponym came from the lake Seirijis, which got its name from the creek Seira name of which is of Dainavian dielect of Lithuanian language (from Lithuanian word "sūrus" meaning either salty or soured). Derivative names in other languages are - Polish: Sereje, German: Serrey, English sometimes "Serey"

History

The lands were inhabited by the Lithuanian tribe Dainavians. Due to the frequent raids and pillaging of Teutonic Order, Dainavians moved to other parts of Lithuania abandoning the lands and Seirijai became a wilderness. From 1383 to 1398 Seirijai was in the State of the Teutonic Order. After the defeat of Teutonic Order in the Battle of Grunwald and the Treaty of Melno (1422), the land became populated again and started to grow economically. Since 16th century Serijai were known as a proprietary land of a ruler. King of Poland and Grand Duke of Lithuania Sigismund I the Old donated Seirijai to Jurgis Radvila, and later it became a possession of Radvila family. Jurgis Radvila built a Catholic church in 1537. Already in 1564 the church was given to Calvinists, since many in Radvila family converted to Calvinism. The tensions between Catholics and Calvinists lasted up to 1655 the Thirteen Years' War with Russia. Seirijai town was devastated and Calvinists retreated.

From 1691 till 1793/1807 the district was a Prussian exclave in Poland-Lithuania (Preussisch Serrey). After that it was given by Napoleon to the Polish vassal-state of Warsaw. 1815 it became part of the Russian Imperium.

During the World War II almost all Seirijai was bombed by German army.

On September 11, 1941, 953 Jews from Seirijai were murdered in the Baraučiškės Forest, including 229 men, 384 women and 340 children. The mass execution was perpetrated by Rollkommando Hamann (a small mobile unit that committed mass murders of Lithuanian Jews in the countryside across Lithuania in July–October 1941, with a death toll of at least 60,000 Jews.) / 1st Battalion 3rd Unit led by Norkus and Obelenis; Lithuanian Activists Front members from Seirijai

In 2018 a monument was built in Seirijai for Lithuanian partisans, who fought against Soviet occupants. Seirijai belonged to Dainava partisans military district.

Economy

Company Seirijų žirgai, which keeps and breeds Trakehner horses.

Notable people

 Alexander Ziskind Maimon (1809–1887) – Lithuanian Jewish author and scholar of the Talmud.
 Antanas Žmuidzinavičius (1876–1966) – Lithuanian painter.
 Bronius Kazys Balutis (1880–1967) – Lithuanian diplomat.
 Juozas Adomonis (g. 1932) – artist, ceramicist.
 Vidas Kavaliauskas (g. 1965) – Lithuanian linguist.

References

Towns in Lithuania
Towns in Alytus County
Suwałki Governorate
Holocaust locations in Lithuania